Sukhraj 'Raj' Singh (born 17 October 1964) is an Indian businessman based in the Tees Valley and proprietor of the multimillion-pound Prestige Group.

Care homes
Indian-born Singh is owner of the Stockton based Prestige Group. His business interests include a number of residential care homes, a construction company and investment properties across the UK.

Football
Singh became vice-chairman of Darlington Football Club in October 2008, appointed by then chairman of the club George Houghton until the club went into administration in February 2009. On 28 May, it was announced that he was taking over the club as chairman. On 7 August, Darlington came out of administration and were given permission by the Football League for Singh to take over as new owner and chairman of the club. Singh, together with previous owner Houghton, were confident enough to appoint manager Colin Todd in the interim period, as well as sanctioning contracts for a new playing squad. Shortly after Todd was handed a permanent deal Singh sacked Todd after he failed to win any of his first nine games and appointed Steve Staunton as his second permanent appointment.
In early 2012 Singh decided to cut his losses and placed Darlington Football Club into administration, 7 months after the FA Trophy victory at Wembley in May 2011.

Singh bought Hartlepool United at the end of the 2017–18 season. He committed more than £1.2 million in cash to the club, saving it from the threat of administration and potential liquidation. Under Singh's ownership, Hartlepool stabilised on and off the pitch and earned promotion in 2021 after defeating Torquay United. In March 2022, in response to the 2022 Russian invasion of Ukraine, Singh pledged £250,000 towards an appeal for those affected by the war.

References

1964 births
Living people
Indian football chairmen and investors
Darlington F.C. chairmen
IIT Kanpur alumni